Moeletsi Goduka Mbeki (born 30 November 1945) is a South African political economist and the deputy chairman of the South African Institute of International Affairs, an independent think tank based at the University of the Witwatersrand, and is a political analyst for Nedcor Bank. He is a member of the executive council of the International Institute for Strategic Studies (IISS) which is based in London. He is the younger brother of former President Thabo Mbeki and son of ANC leader Govan Mbeki. He has been a frequent critic of President Mbeki.

Career

Moeletsi Goduka Mbeki has a background in journalism, with a resume that includes a Harvard University Nieman Fellowship and time at the BBC. He often acts as a political commentator in South Africa, and is the author of a paper titled "Perpetuating Poverty in Sub-Saharan Africa", published on 30 June 2005 by International Policy Network.  He was a media consultant for the ANC in the 1990s, and is currently the chairman of Endemol South Africa, a TV production house, and KMM Review Publishing and Africa. He has also been director of Comazar, which rehabilitates and grants concessions to railway networks in Africa.

In 2003 it was revealed by John Perlman that the SABC had blacklisted a lot of political commentators and that Moeletsi was one of them, possible due to his political views. Moeletsi generated some controversy when he said that Africa was governed better under colonial rule than today. (See October 2007 in rail transport). In October 2006 Moeletsi Mbeki applied for an order to have Jonathan Moyo jailed the next time he visits South Africa. He has been known to oppose certain Black Economic Empowerment (BEE) deals in South Africa and has written articles for the Cato Institute, a USA-based libertarian think tank.

With his book Architects of Poverty: Why African Capitalism Needs Changing in 2009 he triggered a debate about governance, ethics and moral values in African governance processes.

Other activities
 International Institute for Strategic Studies (IISS), Member of the Advisory Council

Writings
 Moeletsi Mbeki: Architects of Poverty. Why African Capitalism Needs Changing, Central Books, April 2009, 
 Moeletsi Mbeki: Advocates for change. How to overcome Africa's challenges, Picador Africa, 2011, 

He has written many articles about the political and economic situation in South Africa, Zimbabwe and the rest of Africa.
 Articles by Moeletsi Mbeki in the New Statesman
 South Africa: Only a matter of time before the bomb explodes
 Africa was better governed under colonial rule than it is today
 Overview of his opinions
 A growing gap between the black elite and the black masses?: Elites and political and economic change in South Africa since the Anglo Boer War
 South Africa: Democracy is Mature, the Private and NGO Sector is Strong, and Government is Weak in South Africa
 South Africa: Roots of Black Poverty

References

Living people
20th-century South African economists
Nieman Fellows
1945 births
21st-century South African economists